"Thou Art in Heaven" is a single by musician Mike Oldfield, released in 2002.

It is from the album Tr3s Lunas. "Thou Art in Heaven" is a cut-down version of the 13-minute "Art in Heaven", which featured on The Art in Heaven Concert, live in Berlin on Millennium night. Unlike the full "Art in Heaven", "Thou Art in Heaven" does not include "Ode to Joy" from Ludwig van Beethoven's Ninth Symphony.

Some of the additional tracks on the CD include various language versions of Oldfield's previous single, "To Be Free", also from the Tr3s Lunas album.

Track listing

The Remixes CD 
 All songs written by Mike Oldfield.
 "Thou Art in Heaven" (Radio edit)
 "Thou Art in Heaven" (Pumpin' Dolls Vs. Mighty Mike Club Mix) (Radio Edit)
 "Thou Art in Heaven" (Soultronik-Stethoscope) (Radio Edit)
 "Thou Art in Heaven" (Pumpin' Dolls Vs. Mighty Mike Club Mix)
 "Thou Art in Heaven" (Soultronik-Stethoscope)
 "To Be Free" (Spanish version) (Radio edit)
 "To Be Free" (French version) (Radio edit)
 "To Be Free" (German version) (Radio edit)

References 

2002 singles
Mike Oldfield songs
Songs written by Mike Oldfield
Warner Music Group singles